"Queen of California" is the second single from American singer John Mayer's fifth studio album Born and Raised.

Music video
The music video for "Queen of California" premiered on YouTube on July 30, 2012.

Personnel
John Mayer – vocals, acoustic and electric guitars
Aaron Sterling – drums, tambourine, bongos
Sean Hurley – bass guitar
Chuck Leavell – piano, Wurlitzer
Greg Leisz – pedal steel

Charts

References

External links
 
 
 

John Mayer songs
2012 singles
2012 songs
Songs written by John Mayer
Columbia Records singles

nl:Shadow days